East Side Digital is a record label and distributor based in Minneapolis, Minnesota.

History
ESD was started and curated by Rob Simonds (who also created Rykodisc) in 1981 to import and distribute vinyl records on Japanese labels to record stores and other retailers.

In 1982, ESD became one of the first U.S. distributors of compact discs, soon releasing records by rock and experimental performers on the ESD label.

Subsequently, Ryko Distribution Partners took over ESD's distribution duties, allowing ESD to primarily be a record label.

ESD is now a sub-label of NorthSide Records, a label Simonds created that specializes in Nordic roots music.

Due to the advent of streaming and downloads of digital music, ESD has reduced operations to only offering music by local band Halloween, Alaska.

Artists
This section contains a partial list of artists who released records on the ESD label.

A–F
 Eric Ambel
 Terry Anderson
 Laurie Anderson
 Marc Anderson
 The Barracudas
 The Beacon Hill Billies
 Peter Blegvad
 Blood Oranges
 The Bottle Rockets
 William S. Burroughs
 Dirk Campbell
 Wendy Carlos
 Bruce Cockburn
 Eller Lynch
 Fred Frith

G–N
 Go to Blazes
 John Giorno
 David Greenberger
 Halloween, Alaska
 Happy the Man
 Henry Cow
 Suzi Katz
 Kit & Coco
 Kevin Kling
 Cheri Knight
 The Liquor Giants
 Bill Lloyd
 Scott McCaughey
 The Minus 5
 Dirk Mont Campbell
 The Morells
 National Health

P–Z
 The Pandoras
 Glenn Phillips
 Plan 9
 The Residents
 Schramms
 Shakin' Apostles
 Jane Siberry
 The Skeletons
 Snakefinger
 Sneakers
 Spanic Boys
 Speed the Plough
 Chris Stamey
 They Might Be Giants
 Kit Watkins
 Barrence Whitfield with Tom Russell
 Wooden Leg
 The Young Fresh Fellows

See also 
 List of record labels

References

External links
 

American record labels
American independent record labels
Independent record labels based in Minnesota
1981 establishments in Minnesota